The Outstanding Young Men award in the Philippines, formerly known as The Outstanding Young Filipinos from 1996 to 1999, is an annual national recognition awarded to Filipinos between 18 and 40 years of age who have made significant contributions to their field or community. The award is organized by the Junior Chamber International Philippines and co-sponsored by the TOYM Foundation, and the Gerry Roxas Foundation.

JCI Philippines, the chapter of the Junior Chamber International or the Jaycees in the Philippines established The Outstanding Young Men awards on October 15, 1959 during the group's 11th National Convention in Baguio. The award was earlier instituted in a smaller scale by the Manila chapter of the Philippine Jaycees on April 6, 1959. In 1984, JCI Philippines started giving women the recognition. From 1996 to 1999, the recognition was known as "The Outstanding Young Filipinos" award. The name was reverted to "The Outstanding Young Men" but women remained eligible for the award with the JCI contending that the word "men" does not "distinguish the difference in gender".

Categories
The following are the categories for The Outstanding Young Men nominees as of the 2020 edition.
Agriculture Sciences
Arts and Humanities
Banking Business
Law
Business
Community Development
Educational Business
Political and Social Sciences
Journalism and Mass Communication
Sports
Medicine
Economics
Science, Technology and Engineering

References

Junior Chamber International
Philippine awards
Humanitarian and service awards